Wanda A. Grinde is a Democratic Party member of the Montana House of Representatives, representing District 48 since 2004.

External links
Montana House of Representatives - Wanda Grinde official MT State Legislature website
Project Vote Smart - Representative Wanda Grinde (MT) profile
Follow the Money - Wanda Grinde
2008 2006 2004 2002 Montana House campaign contributions

Democratic Party members of the Montana House of Representatives
1944 births
Living people
Women state legislators in Montana
People from Lewistown, Montana
Politicians from Billings, Montana
Montana State University Billings alumni
21st-century American women